George Pratt Shultz (December 13, 1920February 6, 2021) was an American economist, businessman, diplomat and statesman. He served in various positions under two different Republican presidents and is one of the only two persons to have held four different Cabinet-level posts, the other being Elliot Richardson. Shultz played a major role in shaping the foreign policy of the Ronald Reagan administration. From 1974 to 1982, he was an executive of the Bechtel Group, an engineering and services company.

Born in New York City, he graduated from Princeton University before serving in the United States Marine Corps during World War II. After the war, Shultz earned a PhD in industrial economics from the Massachusetts Institute of Technology (MIT). He taught at MIT from 1948 to 1957, taking a leave of absence in 1955 to take a position on President Dwight D. Eisenhower's Council of Economic Advisers. After serving as dean of the University of Chicago Graduate School of Business, he accepted President Richard Nixon's appointment as United States Secretary of Labor. In that position, he imposed the Philadelphia Plan on construction contractors who refused to accept black members, marking the first use of racial quotas by the federal government. In 1970, he became the first director of the Office of Management and Budget, and he served in that position until his appointment as United States Secretary of the Treasury in 1972. In that role, Shultz supported the Nixon shock, which sought to revive the ailing economy in part by abolishing the gold standard, and presided over the end of the Bretton Woods system.

Shultz left the Nixon administration in 1974 to become an executive at Bechtel. After becoming president and director of that company, he accepted President Ronald Reagan's offer to serve as United States Secretary of State. He held that office from 1982 to 1989. Shultz pushed for Reagan to establish relations with Soviet leader Mikhail Gorbachev, which led to a thaw between the United States and the Soviet Union. He opposed the U.S. aid to Contras trying to overthrow the Sandinistas by using funds from an illegal sale of weapons to Iran. This aid led to the Iran–Contra affair.

Shultz retired from public office in 1989 but remained active in business and politics. He served as an informal adviser to George W. Bush and helped formulate the Bush Doctrine of preemptive war. He served on the Global Commission on Drug Policy, California Governor Arnold Schwarzenegger's Economic Recovery Council, and on the boards of Bechtel and the Charles Schwab Corporation.

Beginning in 2013, Shultz advocated for a revenue-neutral carbon tax as the most economically sound means of mitigating anthropogenic climate change. He was a member of the Hoover Institution, the Institute for International Economics, the Washington Institute for Near East Policy, and other groups.  He was also a prominent and hands-on board member of Theranos, which defrauded more than $700 million from its investors before it collapsed. His grandson Tyler Shultz worked at the company before becoming a whistleblower about the fraudulent technology.

Early life and career
Shultz was born December 13, 1920, in New York City, the only child of Margaret Lennox (née Pratt) and Birl Earl Shultz. He grew up in Englewood, New Jersey. His great-grandfather was an immigrant from Germany who arrived in the United States in the middle of the 19th century. Contrary to common assumption, Shultz was not a member of the Pratt family associated with John D. Rockefeller and the Standard Oil Trust.

After attending the local public school, he transferred to the Englewood School for Boys (now Dwight-Englewood School), through his second year of high school. In 1938, Shultz graduated from the private preparatory boarding high school Loomis Chaffee School in Windsor, Connecticut. He earned a bachelor's degree, cum laude, at Princeton University, New Jersey, in economics with a minor in public and international affairs. His senior thesis, "The Agricultural Program of the Tennessee Valley Authority", examined the Tennessee Valley Authority's effect on local agriculture, for which he conducted on-site research. He graduated with honors in 1942.

From 1942 to 1945, Shultz was on active duty in the U.S. Marine Corps. He was an artillery officer, attaining the rank of captain. He was attached to the U.S. Army 81st Infantry Division during the Battle of Angaur (Battle of Peleliu).

In 1949, Shultz earned a PhD in industrial economics from the Massachusetts Institute of Technology. From 1948 to 1957, he taught in the MIT Department of Economics and the MIT Sloan School of Management, with a leave of absence in 1955 to serve on President Dwight D. Eisenhower's Council of Economic Advisers as a Senior Staff Economist. In 1957, Shultz left MIT and joined the University of Chicago Graduate School of Business as a professor of industrial relations, and he served as the Graduate School of Business Dean from 1962 to 1968. During his time in Chicago, he was influenced by Nobel Laureates Milton Friedman and George Stigler, who reinforced Shultz's view of the importance of a free-market economy. He left the University of Chicago to serve under President Richard Nixon in 1969.

Nixon administration

Secretary of Labor
Shultz was President Richard Nixon's Secretary of Labor from 1969 to 1970. He soon faced the crisis of the Longshoremen's Union strike. The Lyndon B. Johnson Administration had delayed the walkout with a Taft–Hartley injunction that expired, and the press pressed him to describe his approach. He applied the theory he had developed in academia: he let the parties work it out, which they did quickly. He also imposed the Philadelphia Plan, which required Pennsylvania construction unions to admit a certain number of black members by an enforced deadline—a break with their past policy of largely discriminating against such members. This marked the first use of racial quotas in the federal government.

Daniel Patrick Moynihan, Nixon's first choice for Secretary of Labor, was deemed unacceptable by AFL–CIO President George Meany, which pushed to fill the position with Shultz, then Dean of University of Chicago's School of Business, (with prior experience in another GOP administration, on President Eisenhower's Council of Economic Advisers).

Office of Management and Budget
Shultz became the first director of the Office of Management and Budget, the renamed and reorganized Bureau of the Budget, on July 1, 1970. He was the agency's 19th director.

Secretary of the Treasury
Shultz was United States Secretary of the Treasury from June 1972 to May 1974. During his tenure, he was concerned with two major issues, namely the continuing domestic administration of Nixon's "New Economic Policy", begun under Secretary John Connally (Shultz privately opposed its three elements), and a renewed dollar crisis that broke out in February 1973.

Domestically Shultz enacted the next phase of the NEP, lifting price controls begun in 1971. This phase was a failure, resulting in high inflation, and price freezes were reestablished five months later.

Meanwhile, Shultz's attention was increasingly diverted from the domestic economy to the international arena. In 1973, he participated in an international monetary conference in Paris that grew out of the 1971 decision to abolish the gold standard, a decision Shultz and Paul Volcker had supported (see Nixon Shock). The conference formally abolished the Bretton Woods system, causing all currencies to float. During this period Shultz co-founded the "Library Group," which became the G7. Shultz resigned shortly before Nixon to return to private life.

Shultz was instrumental in freedom for Soviet Jewry.

Business executive
In 1974, he left government service to become executive vice president of Bechtel Group, a large engineering and services company. He was later its president and a director.

Under Shultz's leadership, Bechtel received contracts for many large construction projects, including from Saudi Arabia. In the year before he left Bechtel, the company reported a 50% increase in revenue.

Reagan administration
Shultz is one of only two individuals to have served in four United States Cabinet positions within the United States government, the other having been Elliot Richardson.

Secretary of State
On July 16, 1982, Shultz was appointed by President Ronald Reagan as the 60th U.S. Secretary of State, replacing Alexander Haig, who had resigned. Shultz served for six and a half years, the longest tenure since Dean Rusk's. The possibility of a conflict of interest in his position as secretary of state after being in the upper management of the Bechtel Group was raised by several senators during his confirmation hearings. Shultz briefly lost his temper in response to some questions on the subject but was nevertheless unanimously confirmed by the Senate.

Shultz relied primarily on the Foreign Service to formulate and implement Reagan's foreign policy. As reported in the State Department's official history, "by the summer of 1985, Shultz had personally selected most of the senior officials in the Department, emphasizing professional over political credentials in the process [...] The Foreign Service responded in kind by giving Shultz its 'complete support,' making him one of the most popular Secretaries since Dean Acheson." Shultz's success came from not only the respect he earned from the bureaucracy but the strong relationship he forged with Reagan, who trusted him completely.

Diplomatic historian Walter LaFeber states that his 1993 memoir, Turmoil and Triumph: My Years as Secretary of State, "is the most detailed, vivid, outspoken, and reliable record we probably shall have of the 1980s until the documents are opened".

Relations with China
Shultz inherited negotiations with the People's Republic of China over Taiwan from his predecessor. Under the terms of the Taiwan Relations Act, the United States was obligated to assist in Taiwan's defense, which included the sale of arms. The Administration debate on Taiwan, especially over the sale of military aircraft, resulted in a crisis in relations with China, which was alleviated only in August 1982, when, after months of arduous negotiations, the United States and the PRC issued a joint communiqué on Taiwan in which the United States agreed to limit arms sales to Taiwan and China agreed to seek a "peaceful solution."

Relations with Europe and the Soviet Union
By the summer of 1982, relations were strained not only between Washington and Moscow but also between Washington and key capitals in Western Europe. In response to the imposition of martial law in Poland the previous December, the Reagan administration had imposed sanctions on a pipeline between West Germany and the Soviet Union. European leaders vigorously protested sanctions that damaged their interests but not U.S. interests in grain sales to the Soviet Union. Shultz resolved this "poisonous problem" in December 1982, when the United States agreed to abandon sanctions against the pipeline and the Europeans agreed to adopt stricter controls on strategic trade with the Soviets.

A more controversial issue was the NATO Ministers' 1979 "dual track" decision: if the Soviets refused to remove their SS-20 medium range ballistic missiles within four years, then the Allies would deploy a countervailing force of cruise and Pershing II missiles in Western Europe. When negotiations on these intermediate nuclear forces (INF) stalled, 1983 became a year of protest. Shultz and other Western leaders worked hard to maintain allied unity amidst anti-nuclear demonstrations in Europe and the United States. In spite of Western protests and Soviet propaganda, the allies began deployment of the missiles as scheduled in November 1983.

U.S.–Soviet tensions were raised by the announcement in March 1983 of the Strategic Defense Initiative, and exacerbated by the Soviet shoot-down of Korean Air Lines Flight 007 near Moneron Island on September 1. Tensions reached a height with the Able Archer 83 exercises in November 1983, during which the Soviets feared a pre-emptive American attack.

Following the missile deployment and the exercises, both Shultz and Reagan resolved to seek further dialogue with the Soviets.

When General Secretary Mikhail Gorbachev of the Soviet Union came to power in 1985, Shultz advocated that Reagan pursue a personal dialogue with him. Reagan gradually changed his perception of Gorbachev's strategic intentions in 1987, when the two leaders signed the Intermediate Range Nuclear Forces Treaty. The treaty, which eliminated an entire class of missiles in Europe, was a milestone in the history of the Cold War. Although Gorbachev took the initiative, Reagan was well prepared by the State Department to negotiate.

Two more events in 1988 persuaded Shultz that Soviet intentions were changing. First, the Soviet Union's initial withdrawal from Afghanistan indicated that the Brezhnev Doctrine was dead. "If the Soviets left Afghanistan, the Brezhnev Doctrine would be breached, and the principle of 'never letting go' would be violated", Shultz reasoned. The second event, according to Keren Yarhi-Milo of Princeton University, happened during the 19th Communist Party Conference, "at which Gorbachev proposed major domestic reforms such as the establishment of competitive elections with secret ballots; term limits for elected officials; separation of powers with an independent judiciary; and provisions for freedom of speech, assembly, conscience, and the press." The proposals indicated that Gorbachev was making revolutionary and irreversible changes.

Middle East diplomacy
In response to the escalating violence of the Lebanese civil war, Reagan sent a Marine contingent to protect the Palestinian refugee camps and support the Lebanese Government. The October 1983 bombing of the Marine barracks in Beirut killed 241 U.S. servicemen, after which the deployment came to an ignominious end. Shultz subsequently negotiated an agreement between Israel and Lebanon and convinced Israel to begin partial withdrawal of its troops in January 1985 despite Lebanon's contravention of the settlement.

During the First Intifada (see Arab–Israeli conflict), Shultz "proposed ... an international convention in April 1988 ... on an interim autonomy agreement for the West Bank and Gaza Strip, to be implemented as of October for a three-year period". By December 1988, after six months of shuttle diplomacy, Shultz had established a diplomatic dialogue with the Palestine Liberation Organization, which was picked up by the next Administration.

Latin America
Shultz was known for outspoken opposition to the "arms for hostages" scandal that would eventually become known as the Iran-Contra Affair. In 1983 testimony before Congress, he said that the Sandinista government in Nicaragua was "a very undesirable cancer in the area." He was also opposed to any negotiation with the government of Daniel Ortega: "Negotiations are a euphemism for capitulation if the shadow of power is not cast across the bargaining table."

Later life

After leaving public office, Shultz "retained an iconoclastic streak" and publicly opposed some positions taken by fellow Republicans. He called the War on Drugs a failure, and added his signature to an advertisement printed in The New York Times in 1998, headlined "We believe the global war on drugs is now causing more harm than drug abuse itself." In 2011, he was part of the Global Commission on Drug Policy, which called for a public health and harm reduction approach towards drug use, alongside Kofi Annan, Paul Volcker, and George Papandreou.

Shultz was an early advocate of the presidential candidacy of George W. Bush, whose father, George H. W. Bush, was Reagan's vice president. In April 1998, Shultz hosted a meeting at which George W. Bush discussed his views with policy experts including Michael Boskin, John Taylor, and Condoleezza Rice, who were evaluating possible Republican candidates to run for president in 2000. At the end of the meeting, the group felt they could support Bush's candidacy, and Shultz encouraged him to enter the race.

He then served as an informal advisor for Bush's presidential campaign during the 2000 election and a senior member of the "Vulcans", a group of policy mentors for Bush that also included Rice, Dick Cheney, and Paul Wolfowitz. One of his most senior advisors and confidants was former ambassador Charles Hill. Shultz has been called the father of the "Bush Doctrine" and generally defended the Bush administration's foreign policy. Shultz supported the 2003 invasion of Iraq, writing in support of U.S. military action months before the war began.

In a 2008 interview with Charlie Rose, Shultz spoke out against the U.S. embargo against Cuba, saying that U.S. sanctions against the island country were "ridiculous" in the post-Soviet world and that U.S. engagement with Cuba was a better strategy.

In 2003, Shultz served as co-chair (along with Warren Buffett) of California's Economic Recovery Council, an advisory group to the campaign of California gubernatorial candidate Arnold Schwarzenegger.

In later life, Shultz continued to be a strong advocate for nuclear arms control. In a 2008 interview, Shultz said: "Now that we know so much about these weapons and their power, they're almost weapons that we wouldn't use, so I think we would be better off without them." In January 2008, Shultz co-authored (with William Perry, Henry Kissinger, and Sam Nunn) an op-ed in The Wall Street Journal that called on governments to embrace the vision of a world free of nuclear weapons. The four created the Nuclear Threat Initiative to advance this agenda, focused on both preventing nuclear terrorist attacks and a nuclear war between world powers. In 2010, the four were featured in the documentary film Nuclear Tipping Point, which discussed their agenda.

In January 2011, Shultz wrote a letter to President Barack Obama urging him to pardon Jonathan Pollard. He stated, "I am impressed that the people who are best informed about the classified material Pollard passed to Israel, former CIA Director James Woolsey and former Chairman of the Senate Intelligence Committee Dennis DeConcini, favor his release".

Shultz was a prominent advocate of efforts to fight anthropogenic climate change. Shultz favored a revenue-neutral carbon tax (i.e., a carbon fee and dividend program, in which carbon dioxide emissions are taxed and the net funds received are rebated to taxpayers) as the most economically efficient means of mitigating climate change. In April 2013, he co-wrote, with economist Gary Becker, an op-ed in the Wall Street Journal that concluded that this plan would "benefit all Americans by eliminating the need for costly energy subsidies while promoting a level playing field for energy producers." He repeated this call in a September 2014 talk at MIT and a March 2015 op-ed in The Washington Post. In 2014, Shultz joined the advisory board of the Citizens' Climate Lobby, and in 2017, Shultz cofounded the Climate Leadership Council, along with George H. W. Bush's Secretary of State James Baker and George W. Bush's Secretary of the Treasury Henry Paulson. In 2017, these Republican elder statesmen, along with Martin S. Feldstein and N. Gregory Mankiw, urged conservatives to embrace a carbon fee and dividend program.

In 2016, Shultz was one of eight former Treasury secretaries who called on the United Kingdom to remain a member of the European Union ahead of the "Brexit" referendum.

Theranos scandal

From 2011 to 2015, Shultz was a member of the board of directors of Theranos, a health technology company that became known for its false claims to have devised revolutionary blood tests. He was a prominent figure in the ensuing scandal. After joining the company's board in November 2011, he recruited other political figures, including former Secretary of State Henry Kissinger, former Secretary of Defense William Perry, and former U.S. Senator Sam Nunn. Shultz also promoted Theranos founder Elizabeth Holmes at major forums, including Stanford University's Institute for Economic Policy Research (SIEPR), and was on record supporting her in major media publications. This helped Holmes in her efforts to raise money from investors.

Shultz's grandson, Tyler Shultz, joined Theranos in September 2013 after graduating from Stanford University with a degree in biology. Tyler was forced to leave the company in 2014 after raising concerns about its testing practices with Holmes and his grandfather. George Shultz initially did not believe Tyler's warnings and pressured him to keep quiet. Shultz continued to advocate for Holmes and Theranos. Tyler eventually contacted reporter John Carreyrou (who went on to expose the scandal in The Wall Street Journal), but as summarized by ABC Nightline, "it wasn’t long before Theranos got wind of it and attempted to use George Shultz to silence his grandson." Tyler went to his grandfather's house to discuss the allegations, but was surprised to encounter Theranos attorneys there, who pressured him to sign a document. Tyler did not sign any agreements, even though George pressured him to: "My grandfather would say, like, things like 'Your career would be ruined if [Carreyrou's] article comes out.'" Tyler and his parents spent nearly $500,000 on legal fees, selling their house to raise the funds, in fighting Theranos' accusations of violating the NDA and divulging trade secrets.

When media reports exposed controversial practices there in 2015, the company moved their non-technical directors like Shultz to a "Board of Counselors" and replaced them with a technical board.  In 2016 Theranos' "Board of Counselors" was "retired.". Theranos was shut down on September 4, 2018. In a 2019 media statement, Shultz praised his grandson for not having shrunk "from what he saw as his responsibility to the truth and patient safety, even when he felt personally threatened and believed that I had placed allegiance to the company over allegiance to higher values and our family. ... Tyler navigated a very complex situation in ways that made me proud."

Other memberships held

Shultz had a long affiliation at the Hoover Institution at Stanford University, where he was a distinguished fellow and, beginning in 2011, the Thomas W. and Susan B. Ford Distinguished Fellow; from 2018 until his death, Shultz hosted events on governance at the institution. Shultz was chairman of JPMorgan Chase's international advisory council. He was co-chairman of the conservative Committee on the Present Danger.

He was an honorary director of the Institute for International Economics. He was a member of the Washington Institute for Near East Policy (WINEP) board of advisors, the New Atlantic Initiative, the Mandalay Camp at the Bohemian Grove, and the Committee for the Liberation of Iraq. He served as an advisory board member for the Partnership for a Secure America and Citizens' Climate Lobby. He was honorary chairman of the Israel Democracy Institute. Shultz was a member of the advisory board of Spirit of America, a 501(c)(3) organization.

Shultz served on the board of directors of the Bechtel Corporation until 1996. He served on the board of Gilead Sciences from 1996 to 2005. Shultz sat on the board of directors of Xyleco and Accretive Health.

Together again with former Secretary of Defense William Perry, Shultz was serving on the board of Acuitus at the time of his death. And he has been member of the advisory board of the Peter G. Peterson Foundation.

Family
While on a rest and recreation break in Hawaii from serving in the Marines in the Asiatic-Pacific Theater during World War II, Shultz met military nurse lieutenant Helena Maria O'Brien (1915–1995). They married on February 16, 1946, and had five children: Margaret Ann Tilsworth, Kathleen Pratt Shultz Jorgensen, Peter Milton Shultz, Barbara Lennox Shultz White, and Alexander George Shultz. O'Brien died of pancreatic cancer in 1995.

In 1997, Shultz married Charlotte Mailliard Swig, a prominent San Francisco philanthropist and socialite. They remained married until his death. Shultz was a member of an Episcopal church.

Death
Shultz died at age 100 at his home in Stanford, California, on February 6, 2021. He was buried next to his first wife at Dawes Cemetery in Cummington, Massachusetts.

President Joe Biden reacted to Shultz's death by saying, "He was a gentleman of honor and ideas, dedicated to public service and respectful debate, even into his 100th year on Earth. That's why multiple presidents, of both political parties, sought his counsel. I regret that, as president, I will not be able to benefit from his wisdom, as have so many of my predecessors."

Honors and prizes

 2016 – Presidential Medal of Honor, San Francisco State University
 2014 – Honorary Reagan Fellow Award of Eureka College
 2013 – Honorary Silver Medal of Jan Masaryk
 2012 – Henry A. Kissinger Prize of the American Academy in Berlin
 2011 – Honorary Officer of the Order of Australia
 2010 – California Hall of Fame
 2007 – Truman Medal for Economic Policy
 2008 – Rumford Prize
 2007 – Emma Lazarus Statue of Liberty Award
 2006 – National World War II Museum, American Spirit Award
 2005 – Lead21, Lifetime Achievement Award
 2004 – American Whig-Cliosophic Society, James Madison Award for Distinguished Public Service
 2004 – American Economic Association, Distinguished Fellow
 2003 – Lifetime Contributions to American Diplomacy Award, American Foreign Service Association
 2002 – Reagan Distinguished American Award
 2002 – Ralph Bunche Award

 American Philosophical Society
 Elliot Richardson Prize
 John Witherspoon Medal

 2001 – Eisenhower Medal for Leadership
 2000 – Woodrow Wilson Award for Public Service
 1996 – Koret Prize
 1992 – Seoul Peace Prize (Korea)
 1992 – United States Military Academy, Sylvanus Thayer Award
 1989 – Presidential Medal of Freedom
 1989 – Order of the Rising Sun with Paulownia Flowers, Grand Cordon (Japan)
 1986 – Freedoms Foundation, George Washington Medal
 1986 – U.S. Senator John Heinz Award (Jefferson Awards) For Public Service
 1970 – Fellow of the American Academy of Arts and Sciences

Honorary degrees
Honorary degrees were conferred on Shultz from the universities of Columbia, Notre Dame, Loyola, Pennsylvania, Rochester, Princeton, Carnegie Mellon, City University of New York, Yeshiva, Northwestern, Technion, Tel Aviv, Weizmann Institute of Science, Baruch College of New York, Williams College, Hebrew University of Jerusalem, Tbilisi State University in the Republic of Georgia, and Keio University in Tokyo.

Selected works
 Shultz, George P. and Goodby, James E. The War that Must Never be Fought, Hoover Press, 2015.
 Shultz, George P. Issues on My Mind: Strategies for the Future, Hoover Institution Press, 2013.
 Shultz, George P. and Shoven, John B. Putting Our House in Order: A Guide to Social Security and Health Care Reform. New York: W.W. Norton, 2008
 Shultz, George P. Economics in Action: Ideas, Institutions, Policies, Hoover Institution on War, Revolution and Peace, Stanford University, 1995.
 Shultz, George P. Turmoil and Triumph: My Years as Secretary of State, New York: Scribner's, 1993.
 Shultz, George P. U.S. Policy and the Dynamism of the Pacific; Sharing the Challenges of Success, East-West Center (Honolulu), Pacific Forum, and the Pacific and Asian Affairs Council, 1988.
 The U.S. and Central America: Implementing the National Bipartisan Commission Report: Report to the President from the Secretary of State, U.S. Department of State (Washington, D.C.), 1986.
 Risk, Uncertainty, and Foreign Economic Policy, D. Davies Memorial Institute of International Studies, 1981.
 (With Kenneth W. Dam) Economic Policy beyond the Headlines, Stanford Alumni Association, 1977.
 Shultz, George P. Leaders and Followers in an Age of Ambiguity, New York University Press (New York), 1975.
 (With Albert Rees) Workers and Wages in an Urban Labor Market, University of Chicago Press, 1970.
 (With Arnold R. Weber) Strategies for the Displaced Worker: Confronting Economic Change, Harper (New York), 1966.
 (Editor and author of introduction, with Robert Z. Aliber) Guidelines, Informal Controls, and the Market Place: Policy Choices in a Full Employment Economy, University of Chicago Press (Chicago), 1966.
 (Editor, with Thomas Whisler) Management Organization and the Computer, Free Press (New York), 1960.
 Automation, a new dimension to old problems by George P. Shultz and George Benedict Baldwin (Washington: Public Affairs Press, 1955).
 (Editor, with John R. Coleman) Labor Problems: Cases and Readings, McGraw (New York), 1953.
 Pressures on Wage Decisions: A Case Study in the Shoe Industry, Wiley (New York),  1951.
 (With Charles Andrew Myers) The Dynamics of a Labor Market: A Study of the Impact of Employment Changes on Labor Mobility, Job Satisfaction, and Company and Union Policies, Prentice-Hall (Englewood Cliffs, NJ), ,1951.

See also
 Foreign policy of the Reagan administration
 International Conference on Nuclear Disarmament
 Nuclear Tipping Point

References

Further reading
 Christison, Kathleen. "The Arab-Israeli Policy of George Shultz". Journal of Palestine Studies 18.2 (1989): 29–47. 
 Coleman, Bradley Lynn and Kyle Longley, eds. Reagan and the World: Leadership and National Security, 1981–1989 (University Press of Kentucky, 2017), 319 pp.  essays by scholars
 Hopkins, Michael F. "Ronald Reagan's and George HW Bush's Secretaries of State: Alexander Haig, George Shultz and James Baker." Journal of Transatlantic Studies 6.3 (2008): 228–245.
 Kieninger, Stephan. The diplomacy of détente: cooperative security policies from Helmut Schmidt to George Shultz (Routledge, 2018).
 
 Laham, Nicholas. Crossing the Rubicon: Ronald Reagan and US Policy in the Middle East (Routledge, 2018).
 Matlock Jr, Jack, et al. Reagan and the World: Leadership and National Security, 1981–1989 (UP of Kentucky, 2017).
 
 Pee, Robert, and William Michael Schmidli, eds. The Reagan administration, the cold war, and the transition to democracy promotion (Springer, 2018).
 Preston, Andrew. "A Foreign Policy Divided Against Itself: George Shultz versus Caspar Weinberger." in Andrew L. Johns, ed., A Companion to Ronald Reagan (2015): 546–564.
 Rather, Dan and Gary Paul Gates, The Palace Guard (1974)
 Safire, William, Before the Fall: An Inside Look at the Pre-Watergate White House (1975)
 Skoug, Kenneth N. The United States and Cuba Under Reagan and Shultz: A Foreign Service Officer Reports. (Praeger, 1996).
 Taubman, Philip. In the Nation's Service: The Life and Times of George P. Shultz. (Stanford University Press, 2023)
 Wallis, W. Allen. "George J. Stigler: In memoriam". Journal of Political Economy 101.5 (1993): 774–779. 
 Williams, Walter. "George Shultz on managing the White House." Journal of Policy Analysis and Management 13.2 (1994): 369–375. online

Primary sources
 Shultz, George P. Turmoil and Triumph My Years As Secretary of State (1993) online
 Shultz, George P. and James Timbie. A Hinge of History: Governance in an Emerging New World (2020) excerpt

External links

 Foreign Service Journal article on his Lifetime Contributions to American Diplomacy Award.
 Turmoil & Triumph: The George Shultz Years 
 .
 Association for the Study of the Middle East and Africa (ASMEA)

Video
 
 FreeToChooseNetwork
  (April 15, 2008, at Stanford)
 George Shultz on panel aired on Democracy Now! program, September 6, 2007

|-

|-

|-

|-

1920 births
2021 deaths
20th-century American economists
20th-century American male writers
20th-century American memoirists
20th-century American politicians
21st-century American economists
21st-century American male writers
21st-century American non-fiction writers
21st-century American politicians
American centenarians
American people of German descent
American political writers
Bechtel
Businesspeople from San Francisco
Burials in Massachusetts
California Republicans
Directors of the Office of Management and Budget
Distinguished Fellows of the American Economic Association
Dwight-Englewood School alumni
Economists from California
Economists from New Jersey
Economists from New York (state)
Eisenhower administration personnel
Fellows of the American Academy of Arts and Sciences
Honorary Officers of the Order of Australia
Hoover Institution people
Industry and corporate fellows
Loomis Chaffee School alumni
MIT School of Humanities, Arts, and Social Sciences alumni
MIT School of Humanities, Arts, and Social Sciences faculty
MIT Sloan School of Management faculty
Men centenarians
Military personnel from New York City
New York (state) Republicans
Nixon administration cabinet members
People from Englewood, New Jersey
Politicians from New York City
Politicians from San Francisco
Presidential Medal of Freedom recipients
Princeton University alumni
Reagan administration cabinet members
Recipients of the Order of the Rising Sun with Paulownia Flowers
Recipients of the Silver Medal of Jan Masaryk
Social Science Research Council
Stanford University faculty
The Washington Institute for Near East Policy
Theranos people
United States Marine Corps officers
United States Marine Corps personnel of World War II
United States Secretaries of Labor
United States Secretaries of State
United States Secretaries of the Treasury
University of Chicago faculty
Writers from New York City
Member of the Mont Pelerin Society